A minor premiership is the title given to the team which finishes a sporting competition first in the league standings after the regular season but prior to commencement of the finals in several Australian sports leagues.

Origins 
The etymology of the term was based on terminology in Australia from the end of the 19th century, where the regular season was referred to as the "minor rounds", and the playoffs or finals were referred to as the "major rounds" (this terminology is still used in South Australia, but has fallen into disuse in other parts of the country). Emerging from this terminology came the "minor premiership", for the top-ranked team in the minor rounds, and the "major premiership", often shortened simply to premiership, for the winner of the finals series.

The term was important in the early finals systems of the Victorian Football League, an Australian rules football league, where the minor premier had the right to a challenge match for the major premiership if it were eliminated at any stage during the finals.

Modern Usage 
The term is used widely throughout Australian sports, and there is often a separate trophy presented for it. The National Rugby League awards the J. J. Giltinan Shield, the Australian Ice Hockey League awards the H. Newman Reid Trophy and the Australian Football League has (since 1991) awarded the Dr Wm. C. McClelland Trophy. The National Basketball League recognises the minor premiers but no official trophy or award is given. Australia's premier association football competition, the A-League, officially refers to the "minor premiership" as the "premiership", and the "major premiership" as the "championship", which is more common with other association football competitions, but "minor premiership" is still used colloquially in the sports media even though it is incorrect terminology with regard to the A-League.

Outside Australia 
Although the concept of a minor premiership exists in North America, and a separate award is often presented for the best record in the regular season, the term "minor premiership" is not used. The Presidents' Trophy is awarded by the National Hockey League to the team which finishes first in the standings at the end of the season, as are the Supporters' Shield in Major League Soccer and the NWSL Shield in the National Women's Soccer League.

In the British rugby league competition the Super League awards the League Leaders' Shield since 2003 to the team at the top of the standings, although the overall champions are decided after the playoffs in a Grand Final.

References

External links
 The Myth of the "Minor Premiers" and the "Right to Challenge"

Sports terminology
Rugby league terminology